William Pollock Moat (1827–1895) was a 19th-century Member of Parliament from Auckland, New Zealand.

Pollock represented the Warkworth electorate in the Auckland Provincial Council from 18 November 1873 until the abolition of provincial government on 31 October 1876.

He represented the Rodney electorate from 1884 to 1890, when he retired.

References

1827 births
1895 deaths
Members of the New Zealand House of Representatives
New Zealand MPs for North Island electorates
19th-century New Zealand politicians
Members of the Auckland Provincial Council